Jamesdicksonia dactylidis is a species of fungus belonging to the family Georgefischeriaceae.

It has cosmopolitan distribution.

References

Ustilaginomycotina